The Bevinco is a small river in the northeast of the Haute-Corse department on the French island of Corsica.
It is the main tributary of the Étang de Biguglia, the largest wetland in Corsica.

Location

It rises on the eastern slopes of the  Monte Reghia di Pozzo.
It flows in a northeast direction past Murato and Biguglia to enter the Étang de Biguglia, a coastal lagoon protected as a nature reserve, which drains into the Mediterranean Sea through its north end.
The Bevinco is the main tributary of the lagoon.
It crosses the communes of Bigorno, Biguglia, Furiani, Lento, Murato, Olmeta-di-Tuda, Piève, Rutali and Vallecalle.

Hydrology

Measurement of the water flow were made between 1960 and 2021 at the Olmeta-di-Tuda [Lancone] station.

Tributaries

The following streams (ruisseaux) are tributaries of the Bevinco:

 Pietre Turchine (13 km)
 Rasignani (11 km)
Mormorana (11 km)
 Petriccia (6 km)
 La Serra (3 km)
 Melo (1 km)
 Tragone (2 km)
 San Pancrazio (7 km)
 Sant'Agata (6 km)
 Santa Lucia (4 km)
 Guadone (6 km)
 Bonmartino (5 km)
 Morticcione (1 km)
 Felicione (4 km)
 Fiuraccia (2 km)
 Prato (2 km)
 Tricchiato (1 km)
 la Merla (4 km)
 la Menta (5 km)
 Nepita (3 km)
 Capia (3 km)
 Tasso (2 km)
 Petrelle (3 km)
 Fangone (3 km)
 Sant'Andrea (3 km)
 Torreno (2 km)
 Padula (1 km)
 Forci (2 km)
 Cipetto (2 km)
 Sualello (2 km)
 Tendigiola (2 km)
 Bussu (2 km)
 Monte Grosso (1 km)
 Forcalli (1 km)
 Forne (1 km)

Gallery

Notes

Sources

 

Rivers of Haute-Corse
Rivers of France
Coastal basins of the Tyrrhenian Sea in Corsica